Rare Cuts and Oddities 1966 is an album of live and studio tracks recorded by the rock band the Grateful Dead in 1966.  It was released on CD by Grateful Dead Records on March 25, 2005.

Rare Cuts and Oddities 1966 was re-released as a limited-edition, two-disc LP in conjunction with Record Store Day on April 20, 2013.

Track listing
"Walking the Dog" (Rufus Thomas) – 5:38
"You See a Broken Heart" (Pigpen) – 2:50
"The Promised Land" (Chuck Berry) – 2:31
"Good Lovin'" (Artie Resnick, Rudy Clark) – 2:41
"Standing on the Corner" (Grateful Dead) – 2:55
"Cream Puff War" (Jerry Garcia) – 3:37
"Betty and Dupree" (traditional, arr. Grateful Dead) – 5:35
"Stealin'" (Gus Cannon) – 2:53
"Silver Threads and Golden Needles" (Dick Reynolds, Jack Rhodes) – 3:00
"Not Fade Away" (Buddy Holly, Norman Petty) – 3:51
"Big Railroad Blues" (Noah Lewis) – 3:10
"Sick and Tired" (Dave Bartholomew, Chris Kenner) – 3:19
"Empty Heart" (Mick Jagger, Brian Jones, Keith Richards, Charlie Watts, Bill Wyman) – 6:18
"Gangster of Love" (Johnny "Guitar" Watson) – 4:35
"Don't Mess Up a Good Thing" (Oliver Sain) – 2:56
"Hey Little One" (Dorsey Burnette, Barry De Vorzon) – 5:02
"I'm a King Bee" (Slim Harpo) – 6:01
"Caution (Do Not Stop on Tracks)" (Grateful Dead) – 9:18

Recording dates
Tracks 1-6 & 10 – early 1966 studio recordings
Tracks 7-8 – March 2 studio recordings
Track 9 – late 1966 studio recording
Tracks 11-13 – February/March live recordings
Tracks 14-15 – Recorded live at the Fillmore Auditorium in San Francisco on July 3, a concert later released in full on 30 Trips Around the Sun
Tracks 16-18 – Recorded live at the Danish Center in Los Angeles on March 12

Personnel

Grateful Dead
Jerry Garcia – guitar, vocals
Bob Weir – guitar, vocals
Ron "Pigpen" McKernan – harmonica, organ, vocals
Phil Lesh – electric bass, vocals
Bill Kreutzmann – drums

Production
Owsley Stanley – original recordings producer and notes
 Grateful Dead – producers (track 9)
 David Lemieux – compilation producer and additional liner notes
Jeffrey Norman – CD mastering
Herb Greene – photos
Robert Chevalier – photos
Richard Biffle – cover art
Eileen Law – archival research
 Brian Connors – art coordination
Robert Minkin – package layout

Notes

Grateful Dead compilation albums
Grateful Dead live albums
2005 live albums
2005 compilation albums
Grateful Dead Records live albums
Grateful Dead Records compilation albums